Mark Best (born 1 April 1994) is an Irish Rugby union player

He originally played for Belfast Harlequins in Division 2B in the All Ireland League. Best is a graduate of the Ulster Rugby Academy system and started the 2016/17 season on a development contract with the Ulster senior squad. Best has been part of the Ulster set-up from under 18 level, at which age group he also played for Ireland. 

He was a regular feature in the Irish province's British and Irish Cup campaigns over two seasons and captaining Ulster 'A'. He has also played domestic rugby for Ballymena also in the All-Ireland League when not used by Ulster. 

On 3 May 2017, Best left Ireland to join Channel Island based Jersey Reds in the English RFU Championship from the 2017–18 season. He made his first team debut for Jersey against Doncaster Knights in the Championship opener in September 2017. On 2 June 2020, Best left Jersey to join Championship rivals Doncaster Knights from the 2020–21 season.

References

External links
DRFC Profile
Its Rugby Profile
Ultimate Rugby Profile

1994 births
Living people
Irish rugby union players
Rugby union centres
Rugby union fly-halves
Rugby union players from Belfast
Ulster Rugby players
Jersey Reds players
Doncaster Knights players